iTunes Session is an EP by The Decemberists.

References

Live EPs
2011 EPs
The Decemberists albums
ITunes Session